Óscar David Sánchez Nava (born December 13, 1989) is a former Mexican professional footballer who last played for Cimarrones de Sonora of Ascenso MX.

Honours

Club
Chapulineros de Oaxaca
 Liga de Balompié Mexicano: 2020–21

References

External links

Living people
1989 births
Association football midfielders
Ballenas Galeana Morelos footballers
Alebrijes de Oaxaca players
Cafetaleros de Chiapas footballers
Correcaminos UAT footballers
Cimarrones de Sonora players
Ascenso MX players
Liga Premier de México players
Tercera División de México players
Footballers from Morelos
People from Cuautla
Liga de Balompié Mexicano players
Mexican footballers